This is a list of the National Register of Historic Places listings in Paulding County, Ohio.

It is intended to be a complete list of the properties on the National Register of Historic Places in Paulding County, Ohio, United States.  The locations of National Register properties for which the latitude and longitude coordinates are included below, may be seen in a Google map.

There are 4 properties listed on the National Register in the county.

Current listings

|}

See also

 List of National Historic Landmarks in Ohio
 Listings in neighboring counties: Allen (IN), Defiance, Putnam, Van Wert
 National Register of Historic Places listings in Ohio

References

 
Paulding